Alpheus or Alpheios (meaning "whitish"), was in Greek mythology a river (the modern Alfeios River) and river god.

Family 

Like most river gods, he was a son of the Titans Oceanus and his sister-wife Tethys. Telegone, daughter of Pharis, bore his son, the king Orsilochus. Through him, Alpheus was the grandfather of Diocles, and great-grandfather of a pair of soldiers, Crethon and Orsilochus, who were slain by Aeneas during the Trojan War. The river god was also called the father of Melantheia who became the mother of Eirene by Poseidon. In later accounts, Alpheus (Alphionis) was the father of Phoenissa, possible mother of Endymion by Zeus.

Mythology 

According to Pausanias, Alpheus was a passionate hunter and fell in love with the nymph Arethusa, but she fled from him to the island of Ortygia near Syracuse, and metamorphosed herself into a well, after which Alpheus became a river, which flowing from the Peloponnese under the sea to Ortygia, there united its waters with those of the well Arethusa. The well of Arethusa is a symbol of Syracuse. This story is related somewhat differently by the Roman writer Ovid: Arethusa, a beautiful nymph, once while bathing in the river Alpheus in Arcadia, was surprised and pursued by the river god; but the goddess Artemis took pity upon her and changed her into a well, which flowed under the earth to the island of Ortygia. Alpheus took on water form jumping into the stream, but the earth opened and the stream flew underground to appear in a bay near Syracuse, near the island Ortygia, a location sacred to Artemis.

According to other traditions, Artemis herself was the object of the love of Alpheus. Once, it is said, when pursued by him she fled to Letrini in Elis, and here she covered her face and those of her companions (nymphs) with mud, so that Alpheus could not discover or distinguish her, and was obliged to return.  This occasioned the building of a temple of Artemis Alphaea at Letrini.  According to another version, the goddess fled to Ortygia, where she had likewise a temple under the name of Alphaea.  An allusion to Alpheius' love of Artemis is also contained in the fact that at Olympia the two divinities had one altar in common.

In these accounts two or more distinct stories seem to be mixed up together, but they probably originated in the popular belief that there was a natural subterranean communication between the river Alpheios and the well Arethusa.  It was believed that a cup thrown into the Alpheius would make its reappearance in the well Arethusa in Ortygia.  Plutarch gives an account which is altogether unconnected with those mentioned above. According to him, Alpheius was a son of Helios, and killed his brother Cercaphus in a contest. Haunted by despair and the Erinyes he leapt into the river Nyctimus which afterwards received the name Alpheius.

Alpheus was also the river which Heracles, in the fifth of his labours, rerouted in order to clean the filth from the Augean Stables in a single day, a task which had been presumed to be impossible.

Roman references 

Associated often with Antinous, the lover of the Roman Emperor Hadrian. Antinous was a Greek youth who had drowned in the Nile River. After he was deified, coins of the period depict him as Alpheios or Hadrian with Alpheios.

Gallery

See also
, the invisible or subterranean mystical river of Hinduism

Notes

References 

 Fabius Planciades Fulgentius, Mythologies translated by Whitbread, Leslie George. Ohio State University Press.1971. Online version at theio.com
 Gaius Julius Hyginus, Fabulae from The Myths of Hyginus translated and edited by Mary Grant. University of Kansas Publications in Humanistic Studies. Online version at the Topos Text Project.
 Hesiod, Theogony from The Homeric Hymns and Homerica with an English Translation by Hugh G. Evelyn-White, Cambridge, MA.,Harvard University Press; London, William Heinemann Ltd. 1914. Online version at the Perseus Digital Library. Greek text available from the same website.
 Homer, The Iliad with an English Translation by A.T. Murray, Ph.D. in two volumes. Cambridge, MA., Harvard University Press; London, William Heinemann, Ltd. 1924. . Online version at the Perseus Digital Library.
 Homer, Homeri Opera in five volumes. Oxford, Oxford University Press. 1920. . Greek text available at the Perseus Digital Library.
 Lucius Mestrius Plutarchus, Morals translated from the Greek by several hands. Corrected and revised by. William W. Goodwin, PH. D. Boston. Little, Brown, and Company. Cambridge. Press Of John Wilson and son. 1874. 5. Online version at the Perseus Digital Library.
 Pausanias, Description of Greece with an English Translation by W.H.S. Jones, Litt.D., and H.A. Ormerod, M.A., in 4 Volumes. Cambridge, MA, Harvard University Press; London, William Heinemann Ltd. 1918. . Online version at the Perseus Digital Library
 Pausanias, Graeciae Descriptio. 3 vols. Leipzig, Teubner. 1903.  Greek text available at the Perseus Digital Library.
 Pindar, Odes translated by Diane Arnson Svarlien. 1990. Online version at the Perseus Digital Library.
 Pindar, The Odes of Pindar including the Principal Fragments with an Introduction and an English Translation by Sir John Sandys, Litt.D., FBA. Cambridge, MA., Harvard University Press; London, William Heinemann Ltd. 1937. Greek text available at the Perseus Digital Library.
 Pseudo-Clement, Recognitions from Ante-Nicene Library Volume 8, translated by Smith, Rev. Thomas. T. & T. Clark, Edinburgh. 1867. Online version at theio.com
 Strabo, The Geography of Strabo. Edition by H.L. Jones. Cambridge, Mass.: Harvard University Press; London: William Heinemann, Ltd. 1924. Online version at the Perseus Digital Library.
 Strabo, Geographica edited by A. Meineke. Leipzig: Teubner. 1877. Greek text available at the Perseus Digital Library.

Bibliography 

 Virginia M. Lewis, "Two Sides of the Same Coin: The Ideology of Gelon’s Innovative Syracusan Tetradrachm", in Greek, Roman, and Byzantine Studies, 59 (2019), pp. 179–201.
 

Potamoi
Deeds of Artemis
Elean mythology
Greek gods
Metamorphoses into bodies of water in Greek mythology